Mohammad Ibrahim Abu Senna (born 1937) was an Egyptian poet in the 1960s. His writings are known for its smoothness, and his love poems are considered unique.

Abu Senna was an Al-Azhar University, Faculty of Arabic Studies graduate in 1964. For ten years (1965–1975) he worked as a political editor with the State Information Service, a radio host in 1976 as well as a director-general of the Cultural Program in 1995.

References 

20th-century Egyptian poets
Al-Azhar University alumni
1937 births
Living people
Egyptian male poets
20th-century male writers